Transmitter Location Systems, LLC (TLS) is a radio interference satellite geolocation company based in Chantilly, Virginia, U.S.A.

TLS's only business is geolocating the source of satellite radio interference, including one incident when a base in Cuba was accused by United States officials of jamming U.S. satellite broadcasts to Iran.  TLS is a wholly owned subsidiary of Interferometrics, Inc., a science and engineering company.

The company's technology was created from early research in radio astronomy.  TLS owns several U.S. patents on geolocation technology.  It sells and operates a commercial system called TLS NexGen, and provides a 24/7 geolocation service for satellite operators worldwide.

The company also provides various services supporting communications analysis.

References

External links
[Transmitter Location Systems, LLC]
Interferometrics, Inc.

Companies based in Fairfax County, Virginia
Geopositioning
Interference
Satellite radio